Cho Mu-geun (born September 26, 1991) is a South Korean professional baseball pitcher currently playing for the KT Wiz of the KBO League.

References

External links
Career statistics and player information from Korea Baseball Organization

Cho Mu-keun at KT Wiz Baseball Club

KT Wiz players
Lotte Giants players
KBO League pitchers
South Korean baseball players
2015 WBSC Premier12 players
Sungkyunkwan University alumni
Sportspeople from Daegu
1991 births
Living people